Half-Life Server Watch (HLSW) is a game server browser and administration tool written by Timo Stripf. HLSW was originally designed with a focus on administrating and joining Half-Life servers (pre-Steam) thus the name, Half-Life Server Watch. However, over the years, HLSW has added support for other games and modifications.

HLSW abbreviation 

The HLSW definition, Half-Life Server Watch, is no longer felt relevant by the developers of HLSW due to Half-Life no longer being the primary focus, as many games are now supported.

Related projects

PocketHLSW 

PocketHLSW was developed initially as a side project by Andrew Collins but was later adopted by HLSW but still fully maintained by its original author. PocketHLSW is a Google Gadget that completely depends on XML feeds from HLSW and is the first example to make use of the feeds. With PocketHLSW users are able to quickly find a list of servers matching their search criteria, view their HLSW buddylists and see the latest HLSW news.

XML feeds 

HLSW has recently started opening up many areas of its databases by providing XML feeds that are free to be used by developers for any purpose. Currently little documentation exists on the feeds but bits of information can be found in the official forums. PocketHLSW is an example of the HLSW XML feeds capabilities.

References

External links 
 Official HLSW Website
 Official HLSW Wiki
 PocketHLSW

Game server browsers